or , literally "meal-serving woman," is the Japanese term for the women who were hired by hatago inns at the shukuba (post stations) along kaidō routes in Japan during the Edo era. They were originally maidservants hired by the inns, although as traffic along the kaidō grew and competition between the inns increased, they were often engaged in prostitution.

Many inns had prostitutes in order to attract a larger number of travellers. In 1718, the Tokugawa shogunate issued a law limiting the number of meshimori onna to two per inn, giving the inns tacit permission to employ a limited number of prostitutes.

See also
Nakai (Japanese vocation)

References

Further reading
 五十嵐 富夫1981『飯盛女―宿場の娼婦たち』(新人物往来社)
 宇佐美 ミサ子2000『宿場と飯盛女』 (同成社)

Edo period
Service occupations
Personal care and service occupations
Prostitution in Japan
Social history of Japan